The 2022 Alabama Secretary of State election took place on November 8, 2022, to elect the next secretary of state of Alabama. Incumbent Republican Secretary of State John Merrill was term-limited and could not run for a third term.

The Republican primary for this race was held on May 24, 2022. No candidate reached the threshold of 50 percent plus one vote, so an ensuing runoff to decide the nominee was held on June 21, 2022. Although outgoing State Auditor Jim Zeigler won the first round, state representative Wes Allen won the runoff and thus the Republican Party nomination. Allen defeated Democrat Pamela J. Laffitte and Libertarian Matt Shelby in the general election on November 8, 2022.

Republican primary

Candidates

Nominee
Wes Allen, member of the Alabama House of Representatives from the 89th district (2018–present)

Eliminated in runoff
Jim Zeigler, Alabama State Auditor (2015–present)

Eliminated in primary
Christian "Chris" Horn, activist and candidate for the Alabama House of Representatives in 2014
Ed Packard, election administrator in the Alabama Secretary of State office

Endorsements

Debates and forums
The Butler County Republican Party organization held a GOP candidates forum on February 28, 2022 at the Wendell Mitchell Conference Center on the campus of Lurleen B. Wallace Community College in Greenville. The forum was attended by candidates Allen and Packard. It also hosted candidates for U.S. Senate, Governor, and the Alabama Supreme Court.

League of Women Voters hosted a forum for the candidates in the race on April 26, 2022 at the Farley Auditorium located inside the Alabama Department of Archives and History in Montgomery. Candidates Chris Horn and Ed Packard were present; Wes Allen declined due to scheduling conflict and Jim Zeigler fell ill the morning of the forum.

According to Alabama Political Reporter,
When asked about ensuring access for certain marginalized groups such as the disabled, homeless and out-of-area college students, Horn said he knows what it is like to be a marginalized group as a Black man and formerly being paralyzed from the neck down.

“So the first thing is the Secretary of State must not be bureaucratic, but they must lead from the heart,” Horn said. “They must have a heart to hear the concerns of those people, my people and those communities that I’ve been a part of, and certainly be able to listen to the organizations that represent their interests and have an open door— but it's a heart-based leadership.”

Packard also said he would want to work with marginalized groups, adding that he has already been working with the National Federation of the Blind.

“I’ve been working with the Alabama Disabilities Advocacy Program over at the University of Alabama to work on legislation to make voting for people with disabilities easier,” Packard said. “And what I have put out ever since I got involved in this race back in December, is that we should allow those individuals who are disabled to vote the same way we allow overseas, military and US citizens to vote and that is electronically from the comfort of their home.”

However, both candidates stated their opposition to early voting and no-excuse absentee voting.

All four candidates were present at a debate hosted by Eagle Forum of Alabama at the O'Neal Public Library in Mountain Brook.

All four candidates were present at the Doster Center in Prattville for a candidates forum hosted by the Autauga County Republican Executive Committee.

Candidates Allen and Zeigler squared off in a debate at the Gardendale Civic Center just more than a week ahead of the Republican Primary Runoff on June 13, 2022. The debate was cosponsored by WYDE-FM and 1819 News.

First round

Polling

Results

Runoff

Polling

Results

Democratic primary

Candidates

Nominee
Pamela J. Laffitte, corrections sergeant and candidate for Alabama State Board of Education in 2020

Endorsements

Libertarian nomination
No primary was held for the Libertarian Party, and candidates were instead nominated by the party.

Nominee 
Jason "Matt" Shelby, attorney

General election

Predictions

Endorsements

Results

Notes

Partisan clients

References

External links
Official campaign websites
Pamela J. Laffitte (D) for Secretary of State
Wes Allen (R) for Secretary of State

Secretary of State
Alabama